Okse Bay is an Arctic waterway in Qikiqtaaluk Region, Nunavut, Canada. It is located in Norwegian Bay by southwestern Ellesmere Island, east of Buckingham Island.

Geology
The thick series of strata at Okse Bay, characterized by sandstones, mudstones, and shale, are referred to as the Okse Bay Formation.

References

 Okse Bay, Nunavut at Atlas of Canada

Further reading
 Rice, R. J. (1988). The sedimentology and petrology of the Okse Bay group, Middle and Upper Devonian, on S.W. Ellesmere Island and North Kent Island in the Canadian Arctic Archipelago. Ottawa: National Library of Canada.

Bays of Qikiqtaaluk Region
Ellesmere Island